Veravjen-e Sofla (also Romanized as Veravjen-e Soflá; also known as Vīrāvjen) is a village in Chahardangeh Rural District, Hurand District, Ahar County, East Azerbaijan Province, Iran. At the 2006 census, its population was 180, in 36 families.

References 

Populated places in Ahar County